Carlo Visconti (1523 – 12 November 1565) was an Italian Roman Catholic cardinal.

Born in Milan, he was appointed Bishop of Ventimiglia on 5 December 1561, at the age of 38. On 12 March 1565 he was promoted to cardinal and was installed as Cardinal-Priest of Ss. Vito, Modesto e Crescenzia on 15 May. Just two months later, on 6 July 1565, he was appointed Bishop of Montefeltro. This term was short-lived as he died on 12 November the same year, aged just 42.

References

16th-century Italian cardinals
Bishops of Montefeltro
1523 births
1565 deaths
Clergy from Milan
House of Visconti
16th-century Italian Roman Catholic bishops